Bernard Louis Kowalski (August 2, 1929 – October 26, 2007) was an American film and television director of Polish descent, nominated for two Primetime Emmys.

Selected filmography
 Frontier (1956) Season 1, Episode 19 The Assassin
 Hot Car Girl (1958)
 Night of the Blood Beast (1958)
 Attack of the Giant Leeches (1959)
 Blood and Steel (1959)
 Krakatoa, East of Java (1969)
 Stiletto (1969)
 Macho Callahan (1970)
 Black Noon (1971)
 Terror in the Sky (TV movie, 1971)
 Women in Chains (TV movie, 1972)
 The Woman Hunter (TV movie, 1972)
 Sssssss (1973)
 The Nativity (TV movie, 1978)
 Marciano (TV Movie - 1979)
  Four Episodes of Columbo
  Four Episodes of Banacek
  Episodes of Airwolf 
  Episodes of Knight Rider

References

External links 

1929 births
2007 deaths
American television directors
People from Brownsville, Texas
Film directors from Texas
American people of Polish descent